The 2600 Class is a type of Diesel Multiple Unit operated on the Irish railway network by Iarnród Éireann, used mainly for short-haul Commuter services. They sometimes operate Cork to Dublin services in case an InterCity unit is not available. At present the entire class is based in Cork, and is used on local services to Mallow, Midleton, Cobh and on token services to Tralee. A hybrid unit was based in Limerick until it was withdrawn in 2012 and is now stored in Cork.

Description
The 2600 Class were the first modern set of diesel railcars purchased by Iarnród Éireann, who for several years had only run multiple units on the electrified DART service. A total of seventeen individual railcars were constructed by the Tokyu Car Corporation in Japan and delivered between 1993 and 1994 for use on the commuter service between Dublin and Kildare. The stock were the first rolling stock to be delivered in Arrow livery, initially used to refer solely to the Dublin-Kildare commuter service upon which they were deployed, although they were rebranded in 2003 to the new Commuter livery. They were the very last Iarnród Éireann rolling stock to be shipped with the firm's original IR logo, though this was replaced with the IÉ version shortly after the trains entered service. The simplistic nature of its on board services and the fact the windows can be opened and closed has led to it developing the nickname the cattle car.

Deployment
Class 2600 were initially deployed on the brand new Dublin-Kildare Arrow service (now rebranded South Western Commuter). Although purchased for the new service, which began in 1994, they were also to be seen up until the early 2000s supplementing the locomotive hauled "Craven" coaching stock on Western Suburban (now Western Commuter) services, and occasionally on other lines also. Since January 2010, all 2600 class railcars have been moved to Kent Station, Cork, where they work Cork-Cobh, Cork-Midleton and Cork-Mallow services. Eight trainsets are formed with two railcars each, one with odd number, having a toilet and one with even number. Due to the odd total number of vehicles, a Hybrid set 2609/2716 had been formed. This has been withdrawn and is now stored in Cork Shed. All 2600 Class sets carry the new  Iarnród Éireann-Irish Rail logo and silver InterCity livery since August 2013. 2613/2610 was the last 2600 Class DMU to carry the Commuter livery. Sometimes when these units go to Limerick for servicing, a 2800 Class unit is sent as a replacement. When this happens, the two types of train can operate attached, although this is a rare occurrence.

Fleet details

References

External links

 Irish Rail Fleet Information page

Iarnród Éireann multiple units
Tokyu Car multiple units